Il Giornale may refer to:

Il Giornale, a newspaper in Milan
Il Giornale d'Italia, a defunct newspaper in Rome
Il Giornale Italiano, a defunct Italian-language publication from Australia
Giornale del Popolo, an Italian-language newspaper in Lugano, Switzerland
Giornale di Sicilia, a newspaper in Sicily
Il Giornale - newspaper published in Genoa from 1899 to 1904

 coffee bar chain, acquired Starbucks and adopted its name